Karjalan kruunu (Finnish: The Crown of Karelia) is a historical novel by Finnish author Kaari Utrio.

Novels by Kaari Utrio
1978 novels
Tammi (company) books
20th-century Finnish novels
Finnish historical novels